Allan Noble Monkhouse (7 May 1858 – 10 January 1936) was an English playwright, critic, essayist and novelist.

He was born in Barnard Castle, County Durham. He worked in the cotton trade, in Manchester, and settled in Disley, Cheshire. From 1902 to 1932 he worked on The Manchester Guardian, writing also for the New Statesman.

As literary editor, in fact if not in formal title, at the Guardian, Monkhouse helped to launch the career of James Agate by publishing his open letters from France during the First World War.  Agate appears in Monkhouse's play Nothing Like Leather barely disguised as the theatre critic "Topaz".

He began to write drama for the Gaiety Theatre, Manchester, shortly after it was opened by Annie Horniman, along with Stanley Houghton and Harold Brighouse, forming a school of realist dramatists independent of the London stage, who were known as the Manchester School.

Works

Plays
Reaping the Whirlwind (1908) play
The Choice (1910) play
Mary Broome: A Comedy in Four Acts (1912)
Nothing Like Leather (1913) play
Four Tragedies (1913)
The Education of Mr. Surrage: A Comedy in Four Acts (1913)
Night Watches: A Comedy in One Act (1916)
The Conquering Hero (1923) play
First Blood: A Play in Four Acts (1924)
Sons And Fathers: A Play in Four Acts (1925)
Suburb (1925)
The Rag (1928) play
Paul Felice: A Play in Four Acts (1930)
The Grand Cham's Diamond (1932) play
Cecilia: A Play in Four Acts (1932)

Novels
A Deliverance (1898) novel
Love in a Life (1903) novel
Dying Fires (1912) novel
Men & Ghosts (1918) novel
True Love (1920) novel
My Daughter Helen (1922) novel
Marmaduke (1924) novel
Alfred the Great (1927) novel
Farewell Manchester (1931) novel

Essays
Books & Plays (1894) essays
Essays of To-Day and Yesterday (1925)

External links
 
 
 
 Allan Monkhouse papers at John Rylands Library, Manchester.
Play by Allan Monkhouse on Great War Theatre

1858 births
1936 deaths
20th-century English novelists
English dramatists and playwrights
Writers from Manchester
People from Barnard Castle
People from Disley
English male dramatists and playwrights
English male novelists
20th-century English male writers